Asahan is a small town in Jasin District in the Malaysian state of Malacca, which is located near the state borders with Johor and Negeri Sembilan at the foot of Mount Ledang.

Tourist attractions
 Asahan Waterfall
 Laman Tiga Budaya - A tripoint with a stone marking the boundary of three states: Johor, Malacca and Negeri Sembilan and a water theme park.

Sports and recreation
 Saujana Asahan - Sports and recreation centre owned by the National Sports Council of Malaysia.

See also
 Jasin District

References

Jasin District
Towns in Malacca